Sinicaepermenia is a genus of moths in the family Epermeniidae.

Species
Sinicaepermenia sauropophaga Gaedike, Kuroko & Funahashi, 2008
Sinicaepermenia taiwanella Heppner, 1990

References

 , 2008, A new species of Sinicaepermenia (Lepidoptera: Epermeniidae) from Thailand, Trans. lepid. Soc. Japan 59 (2): 149–153. Abstract and full article: .

Epermeniidae